Kantha is a type of embroidery typical of eastern South Asia.

Kantha may also refer to:

Kantha, Amarapura
Kantha, Bhamo
Kantha, Kale
Kantha (film), a 2013 Tamil drama film